Aloidendron is a genus of succulent plants in the subfamily Asphodeloideae. It was split off from the much larger genus Aloe in 2013.

Taxonomy

Phylogenetic studies indicated that several species that were traditionally classed as members of the genus Aloe were genetically distinct and comprised an entirely separate clade. In 2013, the species were accordingly split off as a separate genus, Aloidendron, a decision that was confirmed by Manning et al. in 2014.

Species
, the World Checklist of Selected Plant Families accepts the following species:

References

Asphodeloideae
Asphodelaceae genera
Taxa named by Alwin Berger